Matteo Orfini is an Italian politician, a member of the Italian Chamber of Deputies and President of the Democratic Party.

Biography
Matteo Orfini was born in Rome in 1974. He started his interest in politics when he attended the lyceum.

In 2004 became a collaborator of the left-wing leader, Massimo D’Alema, after his election in the European Parliament.

In 2007 Orfini joined the Democratic Party, becoming the leader of the party’s internal left-wing faction Rifare l'Italia.

On 14 June 2014 he replaced Gianni Cuperlo, becoming President of the Democratic Party.

References

1974 births
Living people
Politicians from Rome
Democratic Party (Italy) politicians
Deputies of Legislature XVII of Italy
Deputies of Legislature XVIII of Italy